The Silesian University in Opava, is a university offering tertiary education. It was
established by the law (Nr. 314/199), adopted by the Czech National Council on 9 July 1991, making it one of the youngest universities in the Czech Republic.

In 1999 the Mathematical Institute in Opava was established after its separation from the Faculty of Philosophy and Science, and in 2008 several other institutes were separated from the same faculty and the Faculty of Public Policies in Opava was created.

The Silesian University in Opava has participated in the Erasmus Programme since 1999. The number of students and employees participating in the Erasmus Programme increased every year for the first 10 years.

Faculties and Institutes 
 Faculty of Philosophy and Science in Opava
 School of Business Administration in Karviná
 Faculty of Public Policies in Opava
 Institute of Mathematics in Opava
Institute of Physics in Opava
 Institute of Creative Photography

Sports

The university's sports union,  (USK) operates inline skating, skiing, snowboarding, snag golf, cycling and kitesurfing. The university also has its own E-sports team, which participates in the National League of Legends League.

Symbols

Seal
Its seal shows the coat of arms of Silesia, Opava is historical capital of Czech Silesia. Knowledge is symbolized by the book in the middle. It is surrounded by the inscription, Universitas Silesiana Opaviensis and the year of its foundation, 1991, in Roman numerals: MCMXCI.

Gallery

See also 
Silesia Euroregion

References

External links

 Official web page of Silesian University

Universities in the Czech Republic
Educational institutions established in 1991
1991 establishments in Czechoslovakia